Areeiro is a freguesia (civil parish) and district of Lisbon, the capital of Portugal. Located in central Lisbon, Areeiro is east of Avenidas Novas, east of Marvila, south of Alvalade, and north of Beato, Penha de França, and Arroios. The population in 2011 was 20,131,

History
This freguesia was created with the 2012 Administrative Reform of Lisbon, merging the former parishes of Alto do Pina and São João de Deus.

Landmarks
Alameda Dom Afonso Henriques
Fonte Luminosa
Caixa Geral de Depósitos headquarters
Instituto Nacional de Estatística
Praça de Londres.

References

Parishes of Lisbon
2012 establishments in Portugal